The 8L45 is an eight-speed automatic transmission built by General Motors Company debuting in the 2016 Cadillac CT6. It is designed for use in longitudinal engine applications attached to the front-located engine with a standard bell housing. It is a hydraulic (hydramatic) design sharing much with the 8L90 transmission. Gear ratios used enable a wide 7.0 ratio spread.

Specifications

Applications

References

8L90